Deedan is a Pakistani serial drama television series written by Attiya Dawood and directed by Amin Iqbal. It stars Sanam Saeed and Mohib Mirza in lead roles. It premiered in October 2018 on A-Plus Entertainment.

It marks the third on-screen appearance of Sanam and Mohib after Firaaq (TV series) and Lollywood film Bachaana.

Cast

Main
Sanam Saeed as Resham
Mohib Mirza as Zardaab

Recurring
Minsa Malik
Huma Nawab as Gul Makai
Laila Zain
Ajab Gul
Rasheed Naz
Tipu Sharif
Sarfraz Asharaf
Tariq Jamal
Ishrat Abbas
Jamal Afridi

Production 
Speaking to The News International director Amin Iqbal said, "I have tried to convey a lot of important theme through Deedan and I wish it leaves some impact and resonates well with viewers".

References

External links 

Official website

Pakistani drama television series
2018 Pakistani television series debuts
A-Plus TV original programming